
Middlewich was founded by the Romans as Salinae on account of the salt deposits around it, as it was one of their major sites of salt production.  Middlewich lies across the King Street fault, which follows King Street and then continues roughly following Brooks Lane.  Salinae is taken to be the Roman name for "the salt workings"  and it also appears to be the name given to Droitwich.  During this time the Romans built a fort at
Harbutts Field (SJ70216696), to the north of the town, and recent excavations to the south of the fort have found evidence of further Roman activity
 including a well and part of a preserved Roman road. A further excavation in 2004 in Buckley's Field  has found further evidence of Roman occupation. A Roman Road, King Street runs between Middlewich and nearby Northwich. It has been postulated that this was the initial route of the Roman conquest of the North West of England, but evidence from pottery (in particular a scarcity of early Flavian samian ware suggests that this is unlikely.
Middlewich was a junction between seven major Roman roads, and it has been known as 'Medius Vicus' (the town at the junction of the roads) in the past.

Roman items in Middlewich Library
A number of Roman artefacts can be found in Middlewich library, including the following

References

Further reading
 Roman Middlewich: A Story of Roman and Briton in Mid-Cheshire. T.J. Strickland, Graham Sumner, 2001

External links
 Roman Middlewich project

 
Middlewich
Middlewich
Middlewich